Fraus fusca is a moth of the family Hepialidae. It is found in the Australian Capital Territory, New South Wales
Tasmania and Victoria.

References

Moths described in 1891
Hepialidae